Ermenault is a French surname. Notable people with the surname include:

 Corentin Ermenault (born 1996), French road and track cyclist
 Philippe Ermenault (born 1969), French track cyclist

French-language surnames